A very significant heat wave occurred in Europe in July 1757. The heat wave may have been the hottest summer in Continental Europe between the summers of 1540 and 2003. Similarly, over Central England, July 1757 was the hottest month on record since 1659, at the time, and would not be beaten until July 1783. It still the ninth-warmest on record in that series.

Accounts

There were contemporaneous accounts of the heat wave noting its effects. Physician John Huxham wrote An Account of the Extraordinary Heat of the Weather in July 1757, and the Effects of It, which appeared in the Philosophical Transactions of the Royal Society in 1758.<ref name="philo1">An Account of the Extraordinary Heat of the Weather in July 1757, and the Effects of It, Phil. Trans. 1757-1757 50, 523, 524</ref> Huxham reports on the effects in England, writing that it caused "haemorrhages from several parts of the body", including the nose, and the uterus in women. Among other maladies, Huxham described "sudden and violent pains of the head, and vertigo, profuse sweats, great debility and oppression of the spirits, affected many. There were putrid fevers in great abundance." Symptoms consistent with dehydration described by Huxham included that "the urine was commonly high colored, and in small quantity."Remarks on the Heats of July 1757, The London Magazine, pp. 563–64 (November 1758)

Horace Walpole wrote a letter on 12 July 1757 noting "the heat of this magnificent weather, with the glass up to three-quarters of sultry." He also commented that on walking his garden, "I thought I should have died of it" and exclaimed: "For how many years we shall have to talk of the summer of fifty-seven!" Four days later he remarked in another letter that "the weather has been so hot, and we are so unused to it, that nobody knew how to behave themselves. Even Mr. Bentley has done shivering."

Other reports include a letter from Brussels which appeared in the London Chronicle, claiming that the temperature on 14 July reached "a Degree of Heat which hath not been felt in this Country for many years," and a report from Dublin calling it the warmest summer in Ireland in the past 35 years.(24 August 1882). Notes, Nature p. 415 (making references to heat in St. Petersburg in 1757 as compared to hot summer of 1882)

Quaker poet John Scott of Amwell wrote of the heat wave in his 1760 Four Elegies: Descriptive and Moral,'', with Elegy II "written in the hot weather, July, 1757." It included stanzas such as "Lost is the lively Aspect of the Ground; Low are the Springs, the reedy Ditches dry; No verdant Spot in all the Vale is found; Save what yon Stream's unfailing Stores supply."

Whether or not Walpole was correct that the 1757 heat wave would be long discussed, it has not been the subject of much subsequent discussion or writing, aside from occasional reprints of accounts such as Huxham's. When the 2003 European heat occurred, the earlier event was noted in the press as holding the prior record.

July 1757 Paris temperatures

References

Heat waves in Europe
18th-century heat waves